Booneville Municipal Airport  is a city-owned, public-use airport located three nautical miles (6 km) east of the central business district of Booneville, a city in Logan County, Arkansas, United States.

Facilities and aircraft 
Booneville Municipal Airport covers an area of 200 acres (81 ha) at an elevation of 465 feet (142 m) above mean sea level. It has one runway designated 9/27 with an asphalt surface measuring 3,254 by 50 feet (992 x 15 m).

For the 12-month period ending December 31, 2010, the airport had 5,000 general aviation aircraft operations, an average of 13 per day. At that time there were 17 aircraft based at this airport: 94% single-engine and 6% ultralight.

References

External links 
 Booneville Municipal Airport
 Booneville Municipal (4M2) at Arkansas Department of Aeronautics
 Aerial image as of February 2001 from USGS The National Map
 
 

Airports in Arkansas
Transportation in Logan County, Arkansas
Buildings and structures in Booneville, Arkansas